Catharine Wood (born July 10, 1973) is an American composer, songwriter, musician, producer, audio engineer and studio owner associated with both popular music and music for picture. Her work is primarily influenced by folk, rock, pop and soul music. In addition to being a vocal activist for songwriters, Wood is recognized for her contributions as a recording arts leader and mentor by AES and NAMM presenting alongside Grammy winning Leslie Ann Jones and Lenise Bent. She has been highlighted in two UK published Routledge academic books as a trailblazer in the professional music engineering and producer community: “Women in Audio” and “Gender in Music Production” in Chapters 4 (Sound for Television and Film) and 13 (Perspective Through a Female and Feminine Lens) respectively. In 2022, Wood was elected to The Recording Academy Los Angeles Chapter Board of Governors.

Early life and education 
Born in Hong Kong, in 1973, Wood was raised in Connecticut, Colorado and California. Wood studied at Colorado College (with a BA in Art) followed by postgraduate study in audio engineering, music production and audio post-production at the LA Recording School where she graduated at the top of her class in 2005.

Music and engineering career 
As a composer and producer, Wood has had original work released by APM/Sonoton under the SureFire Label (Sony/UMG), ESPN (Disney) produced by Norm Whitehurst, on many major networks, and has engineered on music ranging from ABC Music/UMG Soul Movers Band (Mastering Engineer) “Hot Sauce (GEM Remix)” to global commercials during her tenure at Play Studios, Santa Monica; including the first iPhone “hello” TV ad and the “Get A Mac” campaign, heralded by Ad Age as one of the top 15 campaigns of the 21st Century. Wood is credited for her score recording work on The Planters Film, which captured 11 notable awards including AFIFEST Official Selection 2019 and Raindance 2019 top honor, Film of the Festival. Her studio, Planetwood Studios, LLC, is one of the few solely female-owned and operated studios in Los Angeles.

Activism 
As an advocate for songwriters, Wood took the position of Executive Committee member for the Corona Virus Songwriter Emergency Relief Grant Fund in 2020 (created by SONA), alongside Autumn Rowe, Leland, and Leona Lewis, offering grants to support songwriters through the pandemic, following an unprecedented charitable contribution of two hundred and fifty thousand dollars from Sony ATV’s chairman, Jon Platt. Wood is a regular contributor to the Songwriters of North America education efforts as well as SoundGirls.org. In 2022, she was a noted contributor to Emily Lazar's We Are Moving The Needle "Fix The Mix" initiative - aiming to eradicate the dramatic gender gap in the recording industry. Women in music are significantly under-represented in the recording industry by comparison to their male counterparts, with only 2.6% female music producers as illustrated in the Annenberg Inclusion Initiative, published by the  USC Annenberg School for Communication and Journalism in 2021.

Personal life 
Wood currently lives in Los Angeles, California and is a proud member of the LGBTQIA+ community.

Awards 

|-
! scope="row" | 2021
| Hollywood Music In Media Awards (HMMA)
| Pop
| GEM ("No Ordinary Days")
| 
| 

|-
! scope="row" | 2020
| Hollywood Music In Media Awards (HMMA)
| Pop
| GEM ("If I'm Honest")
| 
| 
|-
! scope="row" | 2020
| Hollywood Music In Media Awards (HMMA)
| Downbeat/Downtempo
| GEM ("Malibu")
| 
| 
|-
! scope="row" | 2016
| Hollywood Music In Media Awards (HMMA)
| Singer-Songwriter
| Billy Lawler ("Casualty")
| 
|

Selected discography 

 Hot Sauce (GEM Remix) (Soul Movers Band, ABC Music) 2021
 No Ordinary Days (GEM) 2021
 A Parrot Sipping Tea (Michael Robinson, Azure Miles Records) 2021
 If I’m Honest (Luxury Remix)(GEM) 2020
 DayDream (GEM) 2020
 If I’m Honest (GEM) 2020
 Malibu (GEM) 2020
 Billionaire (GEM Remix) (Max Jackson) 2020
 Bad Idea (GEM Remix) (Max Jackson) 2020
 Higher Ground (GEM) 2020
 Letting Go (GEM) 2020
 Keep Me From Blowing Away (Anna Ash) 2020
 Retro (Boy SODA) 2020
 Missin (Boy SODA) 2019
 I Like The Simple Life (Katie Ekin/APM-SureFire) 2018
 Casualty (Billy Lawler) 2016
 Nostalgic EP (Billy Lawler) 2016
 Epic Boxing (ESPN Theme) 2013

References

External links 
 
 
 Billboard Magazine – "SONA Launches Songwriter Pandemic Emergency Relief Fund"
 Women in Audio by Leslie Gaston Bird (First Edition, Chapter 4) https://www.routledge.com/Women-in-Audio/Gaston-Bird/p/book/9781138315990#
 Gender in Music Production (First Edition, Chapter 13) https://www.routledge.com/Gender-in-Music-Production/Hepworth-Sawyer-Hodgson-King-Marrington/p/book/9781138613362#
 Advocating Equal Opportunity for Women in Music (August 2018) https://www.hmmawards.com/advocating-equal-opportunity-for-women-in-music/
 150+ Female Producers You Need To Know (March 2018) https://aristake.com/150-female-producers-you-need-to-know/
 Creative Conversations 024: Chill Out in Malibu with Gem (Sept 2020) https://www.futuremagmusic.org/publication/creative-conversations-024-chillout-in-malibu-with-gem

American producers
Living people
American women songwriters
American women engineers
American composers
American women composers
1973 births
21st-century American women